The year 2012 is the 2nd year in the history of the ONE Championship, a mixed martial arts promotion based in Singapore.

List of events

ONE Fighting Championship: Battle of Heroes

ONE Fighting Championship: Battle of Heroes (also known as ONE FC 2) was a mixed martial arts event held by ONE Championship. The event took place on February 11, 2012 at The BritAma Arena in North Jakarta, Indonesia and was  broadcast by MNC International.

Background
This was the first event ONE held outside of Singapore.

Results

ONE Fighting Championship: War of the Lions

ONE Fighting Championship: War of the Lions (also known as ONE FC 3) was a mixed martial arts event held by ONE Championship. The event took place on March 31, 2012 at the Singapore Indoor Stadium in Kallang, Singapore.

Background
The event marked the debut of Nicole Chua, believed to be Singapore's first ever professional female mixed martial artist.

Results

ONE Fighting Championship: Destiny of Warriors

ONE Fighting Championship: Destiny of Warriors (also known as ONE FC 4) is a mixed martial arts event held by ONE Championship. The event took place on June 23, 2012 at the 10,200 capacity Stadium Negara in Kuala Lumpur, Malaysia.

Background
Renato 'Babalu' Sobral made his debut for ONE at this event. Last time Sobral fought was against Dan Henderson at Strikeforce: Henderson vs. Babalu II in late 2010.

Phil Baroni was expected to face Roger Huerta at this event, but due to losing a fight just three weeks before the event via TKO, ONE opted to remove him from the fight card rather than await on the Colorado Office of Boxing to confirm Baroni is on a medical suspension.

Results

ONE Fighting Championship: Pride of a Nation

ONE Fighting Championship: Pride of a Nation (also known as ONE FC 5) took place on August 31, 2012 at the Smart Araneta Coliseum in Quezon City, Philippines. It was ONE's first event in the Philippines.

Background
Held in conjunction with the URCC, Pride of the Nation has been described as the biggest event in the history of Filipino MMA as 12,523 fans attended. The event featured three former UFC champions: Tim Sylvia, Andrei Arlovski and Jens Pulver.

There were two controversial incidents at this event which involved the use of soccer kicks. Because of this, ONE will now allow their fighters to use them at any point in a fight from ONE FC: Rise of Kings. One incident was during the bout between Andrei Arlovski and Tim Sylvia. Arlovski knocked Sylvia down and then threw soccer kicks at his head. Everyone thought the referee had stopped the fight; he actually called time because he didn't call "open attack". When it was decided after a five-minute rest period for Sylvia that he could not continue, the fight resulted in a No Contest. The other incident occurred during the fight between Shannon Wiratchai and Mitch Chilson, in which Wiratchai won. However, after a thorough review of the match days after the event, ONE officials decided that Wiratchai landed an illegal leg kick to a grounded Chilson in the second round and referee Moritaka Oshiro incorrectly called an end to the fight as he determined at that point that Chilson could not properly defend himself. The win for Wiratchai was reversed and the fight officially ruled as a No Contest.

Results

ONE Fighting Championship: Rise of Kings

ONE Fighting Championship: Rise of Kings (also known as ONE FC 6) was a mixed martial arts event held by ONE Championship. The event took place on October 6, 2012 at the 12,000 capacity Singapore Indoor Stadium in Kallang, Singapore.

Background
The event was supposed to crown three ONE champions in the Lightweight, Featherweight and Bantamweight divisions, But due to Pay-Per-View time constraints, ONE has opted to move the Featherweight title fight later in the year.

This event also held the first bouts for the ONE Bantamweight Grand Prix.

ONE made its PPV debut via iN DEMAND, Avail-TVN, DirecTV and Dish.

Following two controversial decisions at ONE FC: Pride of a Nation, ONE will now fully adopted the use of soccer kicks at any point in a fight from this event onwards.

Results

References

External links
ONE Championship

ONE Championship events
ONE Championship events
2012 in mixed martial arts
2012 in kickboxing
2012-related lists